Louise Gibson Annand-MacFarquhar  (27 May 1915 – 6 January 2012) was a Scottish painter and film-maker. She was a major contributor to Scottish documentary and was an influential female film-maker in a field that was dominated mostly by males.

Personal life 
Annand was born in Uddingston, Lanarkshire, Scotland on 27 May 1915 to Emma Gibson and Walter D. Annand, both teachers. She attended Hamilton Academy where her father was English Principal. Her younger brother, Walter J. D. Annand, also attended the Academy and went on to become an aeronautical engineer and academic.

During her lifetime Annand married twice, her first husband was Alastair Matheson of Skye. After the death of her first husband, Annand subsequently married Roderick MacFarquhar, the secretary of the Highland Fund (precursor of the Highlands and Islands Development Board) and a former member of the International Brigade in the Spanish Civil War. With MacFarquhar she travelled all over the world, visiting places such as Lapland, Cuba, China, the Faroes, Russia and Barbados before he, too, predeceased her in 1989.

Some of Annand's other interests included the Soroptimists, climbing - she was a member of the Scottish Ladies Climbing Club, she managed to make it up almost every Munro - and the SNP.

Education and work 
In 1933 she entered the University of Glasgow, graduating in 1937 with an MA (Hons) in English literature and language. While studying for her degree Annand took evening classes in art. After university she attended Jordanhill Training College, where the College art master gave her lessons in art and encouraged her to attend evening classes at Glasgow School of Art. On completing college she went on to work as a teacher in various schools in Glasgow until joining the Schools Museums Service in 1949 as an assistant at Kelvingrove Art Gallery and Museum, and from 1970 to 1980 as the Museums Education Officer.

Annand produced 16mm films including the first-ever film about Charles Rennie Mackintosh in 1965. She was involved in and directed many other films throughout her life, though she dedicated a lot of time to her art as well. She first put her art-work on display in 1945 though participated in various solo and group exhibitions following. Her art mainly explores barren landscapes of unfrequented areas, mostly in Glasgow. Her style as an artist changed over time, influenced in part by The Glasgow Boys. She also painted abstracts, working with varied materials from pastels to watercolour. She produced her own publication in 1988, A Glasgow Sketch Book: A Quarter-Century of Observation, in which she depicted Glasgow architecture that was to be torn down. The last piece of art she exhibited before she died was a nude and she was honoured with a retrospective exhibition at the Lillie Gallery in Milngavie when she was 90.

Throughout her career, Annand was involved in arts and arts-related organisations and was Chairman of the Scottish Educational Film Association (SEFA) (Glasgow Production Group) and of the Glasgow Lady Artists Club Trust (becoming in 1975, the Glasgow Society of Women Artists of which she was twice elected President (1977–79 and 1988–91).) She was also a National Vice-Chairman, Scottish Educational Media Association (SEMA) (1979–84); twice President of the Society of Scottish Women Artists (1963–66 and 1980–85) (eventually evolving into Visual Arts Scotland) and a Member of the Royal Fine Art Commission for Scotland (1979–86).

In addition, Annand was a Visiting Lecturer (1982) in Scottish Art to the University of Regina, Canada; Chairman of the J.D. Ferguson Foundation from 1982 to 2001, and twice a member of the Business Committee, General Council, University of Glasgow (1981–85 and 1988–91).

In 1993 Annand was elected an Honorary Member of the Saltire Society; an Honorary Member of Visual Arts Scotland; awarded DUniv by Glasgow University in 1994; and appointed MBE.

Papers relating to her studies at the Hamilton Academy; the University of Glasgow and Jordanhill Training College (together with papers of her father from his time as an undergraduate at the University of Aberdeen) are deposited with the University of Glasgow Archives.

Filmography 

(From the Scottish Screen archive.)

References

External links 
/obituary_louise_annand_mbe_well_regarded_scottish_artist_teacher_and_president_of_the_j_d_fergusson_foundation_1_2055047]
Glasgow Society of Women Artists
Scottish Screen Archive
Visual Arts Scotland'

1915 births
2012 deaths
People educated at Hamilton Academy
Alumni of the University of Glasgow
Members of the Order of the British Empire
Scottish women painters
Scottish documentary filmmakers
Visual arts education
People from Uddingston
Women documentary filmmakers